Asialink is Australia's leading centre for creative engagement with Asia. Asialink works with diverse communities in Australia and Asia for mutual understanding and prosperity. Asialink develops insights, capabilities and connections through programs in Arts, Business, Diplomacy and Education.

History
Asialink was established in 1989 as a joint initiative of the Australian Government's Commission for the Future and the Myer Foundation, one of Australia's oldest and largest philanthropic organizations.

In 1998, Asialink became a non-academic department of the University of Melbourne. And in 2001, a grant from the Sidney Myer Centenary Celebration allowed Asialink to build the Sidney Myer Asia Centre, Asialink's current headquarters.

In December 2012, Asialink's Singapore Chapter, its first outside of Australia, was launched by Australia's High Commissioner to Singapore, Mr Philip Green.

In March 2013, NSW Premier Barry O'Farrell launched Asialink's Sydney office.

In July 2013, the Australian Federal Government announced $36 million of funding over 10 years for the establishment of a  national centre for Asia capability. It was recommended by the Asialink Taskforce for an Asia Capable Workforce and is designed to improve the Asia skills of Australia's workforce and deliver long-term benefits to the economy and society in general.

In January 2017, former Minister for Trade the Hon Andrew Robb AO was appointed Chairman of Asialink and Asialink Business, replacing Sid Myer AM, who moved into a new role as Patron of Asialink.

Penny Burtt, former vice president, Government Affairs, Asia Pacific at Visa, replaced Jenny McGregor AM as Asialink Group CEO in July 2018. Martine Letts, former CEO of the Committee for Melbourne and Australian Ambassador to Argentina, was appointed CEO in 2021.

On June 25, 2019, Asialink, together with Bloomberg, hosted Australian Prime Minister Scott Morrison’s first major foreign policy address of his new term of government.

Program Areas

Through its four key program areas—Arts, Business, Diplomacy and Education—Asialink drives creative engagement between Australia and Asia to build a strong shared future.

Business
As Australia’s National Centre for Asia Capability, Asialink Business provides capability development programs, strategic research, and advisory services and events to assist organisations to acquire deeper knowledge of Asian markets.

Founded in 2013 based on the strategies put forward by the Asialink Taskforce for an Asia Capable Workforce, Asialink Business equips organisations in all sectors to become Asia ready, by developing critical skills, knowledge and networks, to engage and negotiate the complexities of the region.

Grounded in extensive market research, Asialink Business’ practical training programs, research and events enable businesses to forge ahead with confidence to enter and grow in Asia.

In 2019, Asialink Business partnered with, and provided support to, a wide range of Australian organisations such as the Commonwealth Bank of Australia, the Local Government Association of Queensland, the Department of Foreign Affairs and Trade (DFAT) and the New Colombo Plan Alumni Program, and the Australian Department of Industry, Science, Energy and Resources.

Asialink Business partnered with MTPConnect to deliver ‘Digital Health in Indonesia: Opportunities for Australia’, a first of its kind research report into how Australian digital health businesses have the capacity to increasingly partner and collaborate with the Indonesian healthcare providers.

Diplomacy

Asialink Diplomacy works to activate high quality discussion and shape foreign policy in Australia's national interest through deepening and expanding the dialogue around Australia's engagement with Asia.

This program's mission is to build more effective and closer relations between Australia and Asia through influencing policy, developing networks, and informing and engaging the broader community.

In 2019, Asialink Diplomacy convened Track II Dialogues with key regional partners and, with the Australia-ASEAN Council (AAC) and Australia Now, delivered an Australia-ASEAN Emerging Leaders Program (A2ELP). A2ELP is designed to enhance leadership potential and strengthen and expand institutional networks between Australia and Southeast Asia.

Arts
Asialink Arts works to elevate the agency and capability of the Australian arts sector to engage with Asia.

Since 1991, Asialink Arts has promoted cultural exchange between Australia and Asia through residencies, touring presentations, curatorial projects, public forums, research, and publications. As a cultural enabler, capacity builder, and conduit to the Asia Pacific Asialink Arts has supported over 2000 artists and arts workers in Australia to develop expertise and experience, and nurtured and facilitated ongoing connection to a network of collaborators and partners across the region. This has yielded a unique point of difference in the breadth and depth of our insights, cultural capabilities, and connections in Australia across the Asia Pacific.

In 2019, under new leadership, Asialink Arts was commissioned by Creative Victoria to deliver a new Premier's reciprocal arts exchange program in celebration of 40 years of sister-state relations between Victoria and the Chinese province of Jiangsu.

New reciprocal exchanges were initiated between Australian artists and global collaborators in Hong Kong, Taiwan, Indonesia, Malaysia, India, Cambodia, China, Singapore, Japan, and the Philippines.

Education 
Since 1992, Asialink's education arm—Asia Education Foundation—has provided school leaders, teachers and students with the global perspectives and tools necessary to amplify their intercultural skills and mindsets.

AEF delivers informative resources, national and international professional learning, innovative programs and rich networks that connect Australian schools with 23 countries across Asia-Pacific. AEF partners with the Australian Government, state and territory education jurisdictions, education professional associations, business and philanthropic supporters.

Building Relationships through Intercultural Dialogue and Growing Engagement (BRIDGE) is the AEF's flagship International Education Partnership program. Since 2008 the BRIDGE School Partnerships Program has supported the establishment of school-to-school partnerships between communities in Australia and Asia. In 2020, the program expanded to include 23 countries throughout the Indo-Pacific region.

In 2019, the AEF launched the first National Australia-ASEAN Youth Forum under the Australian Government's Australia Now ASEAN Initiative. The forum saw Australian secondary school students connect digitally with students in Singapore, Thailand, and Indonesia, and provided them with an opportunity to debate and find consensus across cultural divides.

Initiatives

Sir Edward 'Weary' Dunlop Asia Awards Program 
The Sir Edward ‘Weary’ Dunlop medal, fellowship, and lecture form an awards program that was established to promote peace and prosperity throughout the Asia-Pacific region, recognise excellence in individuals committed to enhancing Australia-Asia relations, and establish networks of “young Asia-skilled Australians” throughout the region.

The Dunlop medal is awarded to individuals who possess an outstanding record of achievement in improving Australia-Asia relations. In 2019, the medal was awarded to Peter Varghese AO, Chancellor of the University of Queensland.

The Sir Edward 'Weary' Dunlop Asia Lecture was inaugurated in 1993, by the then-Prime Minister of Australia, Paul Keating, to commemorate the life of the late Lieutenant Colonel Sir Ernest Edward ‘Weary’ Dunlop, AC, CMG, OBE (1907-1993), one of Australia's most revered citizens and a pioneer of Australia-Asia relations. The lecture consistently attracts high-profile speakers and is the occasion for awarding the Dunlop Asia Medal. In 2019, the Hon. Gareth Evans AC QC, former Australian foreign minister and Chancellor of the Australian National University, delivered the lecture on the need for a national strategy to break the “bamboo ceiling”. Others who have delivered the lecture include former Prime Ministers the Hon. Malcolm Turnbull QC, the Hon. Kevin Rudd AC, and the Hon. John Howard.

Asian-Australian Leadership Summit 
Convened by PwC Australia, Asialink, Johnson Partners and the Centre for Asian-Australian Leadership at the Australian National University, the second Asian-Australian Leadership Summit (AALS) was first held in 2019.

Australia has a significant and growing Asian-Australian community, at around 12 per cent of the total population. However, there is systematic under-representation of Asian-Australians in senior leadership roles in our community.

The Australian Human Rights Commission (AHRC) Cultural Diversity Leadership Blueprint examined the cultural backgrounds of Chief Executive Officers of ASX200 companies, federal government ministers, heads of federal and state government departments and vice-chancellors of universities. The Commission found that just 1.6 per cent of them were Asian-Australians.

The 2020 Summit to be held in October includes sector-focused discussions focusing on greater representation of Asian-Australians in the following sectors:

 Arts & Culture
 Community/Not for Profit
 Corporate/Business
 Education
 Government
 Legal
 Media
 Science & Medicine

Asialink Insights 
Asialink launched ‘Asialink Insights’ in April 2020. Insights serves as a platform for commentary and analysis from across the Indo-Pacific, and features contributions from leading diplomats, policymakers, and academics from across the region. Visiting fellow at the Strategic and Defence Studies Centre, Australian National University and journalist Donald Greenlees serves as Insights’ senior adviser and editor-in-chief.

Contributors have included John McCarthy AO, Professor Tony Milner AM, Dr Huong Le Thu of the Australian Strategic Policy Institute, Professor Ramesh Thakur of the Crawford School of Public Policy, former Australian Ambassador to Thailand James Wise, and Indira Bagchi of the Times of India.

In July 2020, Asialink Insights launched a podcast featuring on key figures from throughout the Indo-Pacific region.

Notes

External links
Asialink Business
 The University of Melbourne
  Asialink
Asialink Index
 Asia Society
 Asia Education Foundation

University of Melbourne
Think tanks based in Australia
Universities in Victoria (Australia)
International relations
Australia friendship associations
Australia–Asia relations
1990 establishments in Australia

de:The Asia Society
fr:Asia Society